Camillo Tutini (1594–8 August 1666) was an Italian historian, mainly of the Neapolitan region.

Life
Camillo Tutini was born in Naples probably in 1594. His family originated from Sant'Angelo a Fasanella, in the province of Salerno. Tutini often mentioned that one of his ancestors, Landolfo Tutini, received land in Fasanella in 1246 from the Emperor Frederick II. However, by the time of Camillo Tutini's birth his family was impoverished. Camillo had four sisters – Laudomia, Ippolita, Lella, Livia and one brother – Metello.

Having reached the proper age, he entered the famous Certosa di San Martino in Naples, where some of his relatives had lived as monks in earlier centuries. Later at the age of about twenty-five, he left the charterhouse to continue studying and to be ordained a priest. Between 1628 and 1630 he lived in Naples with his mother and two of his sisters. At that time, Tutini started his correspondence with Ferdinando Ughelli, a librarian at the Vatican and the famous editor of Italia Sacra, and Bartolomeo Chioccarello, with whom he closely cooperated. Thanks to his involvement he won recognition for his writing and became part of the city's scholarly and literary circles. 

In 1647, he was linked to Matteo Cristiano, a leader during the Neapolitan Republic as well as to the party favoring French intervention under Henry II, Duke of Guise. These links, and his praise of republicanism, putatively led to the threat of arrest in Naples, and he fled to Rome under the protection of Cardinal Francesco Maria Brancaccio. In Rome, he entered the service on Cardinal Francesco Barberini, having obtained several modest donations. He also worked in Viterbo organizing the library of Cardinal Azzolino. Tutini always struggled with poverty until he died in Rome in 1666 in the Ospedale di Santo Spirito. Several of Tutini's manuscript works are preserved today in the Brancacciana collection at the Biblioteca Nazionale Vittorio Emanuele III in Naples.

Tutini befriended and collaborated with many of the most prominent scholars of his age, including Antonio Amico, Agostino Inveges, Lucas Holstenius and Leo Allatius.

Works	
 Memorie della vita miracoli, e culto di San Gianuario martire vescovo di Benevento, e principal protettore della città di Napoli. Raccolte da don Camillo Tutini Napoletano, in Napoli, appresso Ottavio Beltrano, 1633 
 Notitie della vita, e miracoli di due santi Gaudiosi, l'uno vescovo di Bittinia, e l'altro di Salerno: e del martirio di Santa Fortunata, e fratelli, e del loro culto, e veneratione in Napoli. Raccolte per don Camillo Tutini napoletano et date in luce ad instanza della reuer. archiabbadessa, & monache di San Gaudioso, in Napoli, appresso Ottauio Beltrano, 1634
 Narratione della vita, e martirio di San Biagio Vescovo di Sebaste. Comprabata col'autorità di gravissimi autori per Don Camillo Tutini napoletano, in Napoli, per Lazaro Scrigno, 1635
 Historia della famiglia Blanch, in Napoli, nella Stamparia di Ottavio Beltrano, 1641
 Della varietà della fortuna, discorso di D. Camillo Tutini napoletano, in Napoli, 1643
 Sopplimento all'Apologia del Terminio, in Napoli, s.n., 1643
 Dell'origine, e fundation de Seggi di Napoli, del tempo in che furono instituiti, e della separation de' nobili dal popolo; Del supplimento al Terminio, oue si aggiungono alcune famiglie tralasciate da esso alla sua apologia, & Della varietà della fortuna confermata con la caduta di molte famiglie del regno, discorsi di don Camillo Tutini napolitano published by Beltrano, Naples, 1644. - About the foundation of the Seggi or Sedili of Naples (six administrative units, mainly composed of aristocrats, based on neighborhoods)
 Prodigiosi portenti del Monte Vesuvio, in Napoli, s.n., 1650
 Rerum sacrarum sylvula. Auctore Michaele Monacho canonico Capuano. Opus posthumum. Accurante Camillo Tutino, Romae, ex typographia reu. Camerae Apostolicae, 1655
 Discorsi de sette officij overo de sette grandi del Regno di Napoli di don Camillo Tutini napoletano. Parte prima. Nella quale si tratta, del Contestabile, del Maestro Giustitieri, e dell'Ammirante, in Roma, per Iacomo Dragondelli, 1666
 Historia della famiglia Blanch (containing a biography of the Contemporary General Gian Tomaso Blanch who fought for the Spanish Army), by Don Camillo Tutini with supplement by Carlo De Lellis, Published by Ludovico Cavallo, Naples, 1670.

References

Bibliography 
 
 

1594 births
1667 deaths
People from Salerno
17th-century Italian historians